Robin Haase was the defending champion, but chose not to compete.
Andreas Haider-Maurer won the title, defeating Matteo Viola in the final.

Seeds

Draw

Final four

Top half

Bottom half

References
Main Draw
Qualifying Singles

Citta di Caltanissetta - Singles
Città di Caltanissetta